Eric Johnson (born 16 December 1944) is an English former professional footballer who played as a left-half. He made appearances in the English Football League with Wrexham in the 1960s, along with playing in the Welsh league with Rhyl.

References

1944 births
Living people
English footballers
Association football wing halves
Everton F.C. players
Wrexham A.F.C. players
Rhyl F.C. players
English Football League players